Úrvalsdeild kvenna; English: Women's Premier League, known as Subway deild kvenna for sponsorship reasons, is the highest basketball competition among women's clubs in Iceland. It is administrated by the Icelandic Basketball Federation. It was founded in 1952 and, until 2007, it was known as 1. deild kvenna (English: Women's First division).

Champions

Notes

Titles per club

Awards and honors

Domestic All-First Team

The Women's Domestic All-First Team is an annual Úrvalsdeild honor bestowed on the best players in the league following every season.

Domestic Player of the Year

Foreign Player of the Year

Úrvalsdeild Women's Playoffs MVP

Úrvalsdeild Playoffs MVP award is awarded annually to the player judged most valuable to his team during the Úrvalsdeild playoffs.

Defensive Player of the Year

Newcomer of the Year

Coach of the Year

References

External links
 KKÍ.is
Official page

 
 
Basketball leagues in Iceland
Iceland
Sports leagues established in 1952
1952 establishments in Iceland
Basketball
Professional sports leagues in Iceland